The highway system of Essex County, New York, comprises  of roads maintained by the New York State Department of Transportation, the county, and its towns and villages. Eighteen state-maintained highways enter the county, which account for a combined  of the state highway mileage in New York. Several highways within the borders of the county serve as connections to ferry landings and bridges across Lake Champlain.

Essex County is served by one Interstate Highway, I-87, known locally as the Adirondack Northway. US 9, the only United States Numbered Highway in the county, closely parallels I-87 as both highways head north–south across the county. Essex County is also served by 11 state touring routes and six reference routes, the latter of which are short unsigned connectors. The longest touring route in Essex County is NY 9N, which runs for  through the county.

Highways

Interstate and US Highways
The highway was assigned after being built in 1967 to connect Keeseville to the Clinton County line, paralleling the alignment of US 9.

The first, spanning , enters from Warren County near Schroon Lake before entering Clinton County temporarily. The second, spanning , stretches from both lines of Clinton County. US 9 was assigned in the area in 1926 along a stagecoach route and has remained virtually unchanged since.

State touring routes

Some state highways which once entered Essex County have been eliminated entirely, including NY 192 (now part of NY 86), NY 427 and NY 86A (both now part of NY 73); others, like NY 8, still exist but no longer pass through the county. NY 8 was once concurrent with Routes 9N and 22, which continue into Essex County from Warren County, and the route ended in Crown Point at the Vermont border. The northernmost segment of NY 8's former routing through the county is now NY 185.

State reference routes
There are six reference routes in Essex County; a seventh, NY 910L, was redesignated NY 185 on April 4, 2008, as part of a New York State Department of Transportation project to rehabilitate the Champlain Bridge. Around this time, there was an addition to the highway system, with the designation of NY 915K, a short connector leading to exit 33 on the Adirondack Northway.

County routes
There are over 60 county routes in Essex County, signed with the pentagonal county highway shields found in most of the state. The first in order is CR 2, also known as Corduroy Road and Creek Road in Ticonderoga; the last is CR 86E, known locally as Saint Huberts Road in Saint Huberts. In Keene, there are five county routes along NY 73 that are former alignments of NY 86A, which previously ran along that alignment.

List of Interstate, US, and state highways
The chart below shows the Interstate, U.S., and state highways that enter or have previously entered Essex County, and the towns they serve or served in order of how the road encounters them. The "Formed" column refers to the date that the route was assigned or extended into the county; likewise, "Removed" refers to the date that the route ceased to exist within the Essex County limits. The measurements given in the "Length" columns refer to a route's length within Essex County.

List of county routes
County routes in Essex County are signed with the Manual on Uniform Traffic Control Devices-standard yellow-on-blue pentagon route marker.

See also

County routes in New York

References

External links

Essex
Transportation in Essex County, New York